Her Majesty the Barmaid or Her Majesty Love is a 1931 German comedy film directed by Joe May and starring Käthe von Nagy, Francis Lederer and Otto Wallburg. It was shot at the Joinville Studios of Pathé in Paris. It premiered on 9 January 1931. A separate French-language version His Highness Love was produced at the same time. An Amerian remake Her Majesty, Love was also released the same year by Hollywood studio Warner Brothers.

Main cast

See also
 Son altesse l'amour (1931, French-language version)
 Her Majesty, Love (1931, American remake)

References

Bibliography
 
 Klaus, Ulrich J. Deutsche Tonfilme: Jahrgang 1931. Klaus-Archiv, 2006.

External links

1931 films
Films of the Weimar Republic
1931 comedy films
German comedy films
1930s German-language films
Films directed by Joe May
German multilingual films
German black-and-white films
Films produced by Joe May
Films set in Berlin
Films set in Venice
1931 multilingual films
1930s German films
Films shot at Joinville Studios